St. Quintin Park & Wormwood Scrubs was a railway station on the West London Railway on the border of North Kensington and Hammersmith & Fulham, West London. It was situated on an embankment next to North Pole Road, close to the road's junction with Wood Lane and near Wormwood Scrubs in what is now the London Borough of Hammersmith and Fulham.

The station was located on two different sites during its history. The original station building and platforms, constructed mostly of wood, opened on 1 August 1871 with the name Wormwood Scrubs, alternatively spelt Wormwood Scrubbs, but closed on 1 November 1893 and the station was resited  further north, to the north side of North Pole Road. It had been renamed St. Quintin Park & Wormwood Scrubs on 1 August 1892. Under that name it remained operational until it was struck by an incendiary bomb on the 3rd Oct 1940, and destroyed by fire. The second station, also of wooden construction, burned away and its remains were demolished.

Most electric trains on the present-day West London Line stop near the site of the former station to change current collection method, as the line to the north is electrified by AC overhead lines and to the south by DC third rail. In 2009 local authority leaders lobbied the government to build a new station a short distance to the north of the disused one, however, such plans have not materialised.

References

External links
 (site record of the 1871 station)
 (site record of the 1893 station)

Disused railway stations in the London Borough of Hammersmith and Fulham
Former West London Railway stations
Railway stations in Great Britain opened in 1871
Railway stations in Great Britain closed in 1893
Railway stations in Great Britain opened in 1893
Railway stations in Great Britain closed in 1940
Buildings and structures in Notting Hill
North Kensington
1871 establishments in England
1940 disestablishments in England